Ken Dean (born 10 August 1938) is a former Australian rules footballer who played with North Melbourne in the Victorian Football League (VFL).

Dean was a defender, seen mostly in a back pocket, but started out as a half-forward. He came to the club from North Colts, as a 17-year-old in 1956. Many of his early appearances were made beside his brother Norm. Their father, Fred Dean, had also played for North Melbourne.

He left to coach Victoria Football Association club Sunshine in 1968.

References

1938 births
Australian rules footballers from Victoria (Australia)
North Melbourne Football Club players
Sunshine Football Club (VFA) players
Sunshine Football Club (VFA) coaches
Living people